colour centre may refer to:

 colour centre, a region in the brain
 chromophores
 Nitrogen-vacancy_center in diamond
 Silicon-vacancy center in diamond